Impact Plus Monthly Specials are a series of live professional wrestling events held by Impact Wrestling and seen exclusively on their streaming service, Impact Plus. 

On April 28, 2019, during Rebellion, Impact announced the launch of Impact Plus, which replaced their previous streaming service, the Global Wrestling Network (GWN). Impact Plus would feature its own series of monthly specials, which in-turn succeed the previous One Night Only series of events that were primarily taped for pay-per-view and, later, GWN. Unlike those events, Impact Plus specials are broadcast live on the service and are connected to the angles from Impact's weekly television series leading into the company's main pay-per-view events. 

Beginning in 2021, the monthly specials were also made available on YouTube through the  "Impact Wrestling Insiders" membership program introduced on August 3, 2021.

Past events

2019

2020

2021

2022

2023

Upcoming events

References 

 
Impact Wrestling
2019 in professional wrestling